Telmatobius truebae is a species of frog in the family Telmatobiidae.
It is endemic to Peru.
Its natural habitats are subtropical or tropical moist montane forest, rivers, and canals and ditches.

References

truebae
Amphibians of the Andes
Amphibians of Peru
Endemic fauna of Peru
Taxonomy articles created by Polbot
Amphibians described in 1993